Trevor Fishlock (born 21 February 1941) is a British reporter, author and broadcaster. He has worked as a foreign correspondent for The Times and The Daily Telegraph, reporting from more than 70 countries, and has written and broadcast programmes for television and radio. He has published several books with major publishing houses, including several on Wales. Fishlock was born in Hereford, and lives in Cardiff. He has broadcast from the National Library of Wales and gave the Machynlleth Festival's Hallstatt Lecture in 1999.

Foreign correspondent
Fishlock worked as a foreign correspondent for The Times in numerous countries for 17 years, reporting from more than 60 countries including Wales (1969–77), India (1980–83) and the USA (1983–86), later becoming Moscow correspondent for the Daily Telegraph, and writing a travel column. At The Press Awards he won Foreign Reporter of the Year in 1982 and International Reporter of the Year in 1986.

Author
Fishlock writes books about the people and places he has encountered while working abroad and at home, covering politics, history, biography and society. He was inspired to write Senedd (2011) after seeing early sketches of the planned Welsh Assembly building and watching them evolve into the completed Senedd. His book India File (1987) was in The Daily Telegraph's Michael Kerr's list of his top ten travel books in 2011 and about which he said that while it was first published “… in 1983, and could hardly be said to be up to the minute, but its 200 pages still make for a great primer in what can initially be an overwhelming country.” A Gift of Sunlight tells the story of the Davies sisters who collected paintings and bequeathed them to the Welsh nation. Fishlock presented a BBC documentary about the sisters, broadcast in May 2014, and gave a talk about the book at Swansea’s National Waterfront Museum in 2015.

Publications
 Wales and the Welsh. Littlehampton Book Services (1972) 
 Americans and nothing else. Littlehampton Book Services (1980) 
 Talking of Wales. Academy Chicago Pub. (1982)  
 Gandhi’s Children. Universe Books (1983) 
 Indira Gandhi. David & Charles (1986) 
 The State of America. John Murray (1986) 
 India File. John Murray (1987) 
 Out of Red Darkness: Reports from the Collapsing Soviet Empire. John Murray (1993) 
 Say who you are. BBC Cymru (1993)  (broadcast on Radio Wales)
 My Foreign Country: Trevor Fishlock on Britain. John Murray (1997) 
 Fishlock’s Wild Tracks. Seren Books (1998)  (from the TV series)
 Invitation to a Mystery. Hallstatt Lecture, Machynlleth (1999) 
 More Fishlock’s Wild Tracks Seren Books (2000) 
 Fishlock’s Sea Stories. Poetry Wales Press (2003) 
 More Fishlock’s Sea Stories. Ceiniog (2005) 
 In This Place - The National Library of Wales & in Welsh: Yn Y Lle Hwn: Llyfrgell Genedlaethol Cymru (trans Mereid Hopwood). National Library of Wales (2007) 
 Conquerors of Time. Faber & Faber (2008) 
 Pembrokeshire: Journeys & Stories (illustrated by Jeremy Moore). Gomer Press (2011) 
 Senedd. Graffed (2011) 
 A Gift of Sunlight. Gomer Press (2014) 

Broadcaster
Fishlock is probably best known for his long-running television series Wild Tracks, broadcast from 1998. He has presented over 150 TV and radio programmes. In 2012 he presented an ITV documentary about the Pembrokeshire island of Skokholm and in 2013 revisited “his” Wales in Fishlock’s Wales: Forty Years On'' for ITV.

References

1941 births
Living people
British writers